Bailey George Simonsson (born 18 February 1998) is a New Zealand Māori international rugby league footballer who plays as a er for the Parramatta Eels in the NRL.

Background
Simonsson was born in Mona Vale, New South Wales, Australia. He is of Māori heritage through his father and European heritage through his mother.Rugby: Bailey Simonsson has strong BOP ties Retrieved 12 July 2022.</ref>

Playing career

Early career
Simonsson played for the Canberra Raiders in the Harold Matthews Cup (under 16s), later joining the Canterbury-Bankstown Bulldogs to play S. G. Ball Cup (under 18s) and NYC (under 20s) until 2017.

Switch to rugby union
In 2018, Simonsson represented the New Zealand rugby 7s team at the tournaments in Hong Kong, London, and Paris.

Return to rugby league
Simonsson signed with the Canberra Raiders in December 2018. He made his first grade debut in Round 1 of the 2019 NRL season against the Gold Coast Titans scoring a try in a 21-0 victory.
In Round 20 against the New Zealand Warriors, Simonsson scored 2 tries as Canberra won the match 46-12 at Mount Smart Stadium.

In the 2019 qualifying final, Simonsson scored a try as Canberra staged a shock 12-10 victory over minor premiers Melbourne at AAMI Park to secure a home preliminary final.
Simonsson played from the bench in the 2019 NRL Grand Final against the Sydney Roosters in which Canberra were defeated 14-8 at ANZ Stadium.  It was Canberra's first grand final appearance in 25 years.

Simonsson suffered a season-ending shoulder injury against Melbourne at GIO Stadium in round 9 of the 2020 NRL season after which he underwent surgery and spent the rest of the season in rehabilitation.

In round 22 of the 2021 NRL season, he scored a hat-trick in Canberra's 26-16 loss against Melbourne.
On 10 December 2021, Simonsson signed a three-year deal to join Parramatta starting in the 2022 NRL season.
In round 1 of the 2022 NRL season, he made his club debut for Parramatta in their 32-28 victory over the Gold Coast.
In round 12 of the 2022 NRL season, he scored two tries for Parramatta in their 28-20 victory over his former side Canberra.
Simonsson played for Parramatta in their 28-12 Grand Final loss to Penrith.  In the second half of the match, Simonsson made a break down the left hand side of the field but was tackled into touch by Dylan Edwards.  Simonsson injured his shoulder during the tackle and was taken from the field with his arm being held in a sling.

References

External links
Raiders profile
All Blacks sevens profile

1998 births
Living people
Australian people of Māori descent
Australian people of New Zealand descent
Australian people of Swedish descent
Australian rugby league players
Australian rugby union players
Canberra Raiders players
Parramatta Eels players
New Zealand international rugby sevens players
New Zealand Māori rugby league players
New Zealand Māori rugby league team players
People educated at Newington College
Rugby league players from Sydney
Rugby league wingers